The 5th Chess Olympiad, organized by the FIDE and comprising an open and (unofficial) women's tournament, as well as several events designed to promote the game of chess, took place between July 12 and July 23, 1933, in Folkestone, United Kingdom. The 4th Women's World Chess Championship also took place during the Olympiad.

Results

Team standings
{| class="wikitable"
! # !!Country !! Players !! Points
|-
| style="background:gold;"|1 ||  || Kashdan, Marshall, Fine, Dake, Simonson || 39 
|-
| style="background:silver;"|2 ||  || Flohr, Treybal K., Rejfíř, Opočenský, Skalička || 37½
|-
| style="background:#cc9966;"|3 ||  || Ståhlberg,  Stoltz, Lundin, Berndtsson || 34
|-
| 4 ||  || Tartakower, Frydman, Regedziński, Appel, Makarczyk || 34
|-
| 5 ||  || Maróczy, Steiner L., Vajda, Havasi, Lilienthal || 34
|-
| 6 ||  || Grünfeld, Eliskases, Glass, Müller, Igel  || 33½
|-
| 7 ||  || Mikėnas, Vaitonis, Vistaneckis, Luckis, Abramavičius || 30½
|-
| 8 ||  || Alekhine, Betbeder, Kahn, Duchamp, Voisin|| 28
|-
| 9 ||  || Apšenieks, Petrovs, Feigins, Hasenfuss || 27½
|-
| 10 ||  || Sultan Khan, Thomas, Winter, Michell, Alexander || 27
|-
| 11 ||  || Rosselli del Turco, Monticelli, Sacconi, Norcia, Campolongo || 24½
|-
| 12 ||  || Andersen, Enevoldsen, Gemzøe, Nielsen B., Nielsen J. || 22½
|-
| 13 ||  || Soultanbeieff, Dunkelblum, Engelmann, Devos || 17
|-
| 14 ||  || Ásgeirsson, Gilfer, Thorvaldsson, Sigurdsson || 17
|-
| 15 ||  || Fairhurst, Page, MacIsaac, MacKenzie, Combe || 14
|}

The English team still went under the name of Great Britain, even though it only consisted of English players and Scotland participated with their own team.

Estonia was supposed to participate, but the team never showed up.

Team results

Individual medals
{| class="wikitable"
! Board 1 !! !! Board 2 !! !! Board 3 !! !! Board 4 !! !! Reserve !! 
|-
|  Alexander Alekhine || style="background:gold;"| 9½ / 1279.2 ||  Frank Marshall || style="background:gold;"| 7 / 1070.0 ||  Erik Lundin || style="background:gold;"| 10 / 1471.4 ||  Karel Opočenský || style="background:gold;"| 11½ / 1388.5 ||  Andor Lilienthal || style="background:gold;"| 10 / 1376.9
|-
|  Isaac Kashdan || style="background:silver;"| 10 / 1471.4 ||  Louis Betbeder || style="background:silver;"| 8 / 1866.7 ||  Reuben Fine || style="background:silver;"| 9 / 1369.2 ||  Arthur Dake || style="background:silver;"| 10 / 1376.9 ||  Leonardas Abramavičius || style="background:silver;"| 6 / 966.7
|-
|  Savielly Tartakower Salo Flohr || style="background:#cc9966;"| 9 / 1464.3 ||  Paulino Frydman || style="background:#cc9966;"| 7½ / 1262.5 ||  Movsas Feigins || style="background:#cc9966;"| 9 / 1464.3 ||  Hans Müller || style="background:#cc9966;"| 9 / 1369.2 ||  C. H. O'Donel Alexander || style="background:#cc9966;"| 7 / 1163.6
|}

References

5th Chess Olympiad: Folkestone 1933 OlimpBase

05
Olympiad 05
Olympiad 05
Chess Olympiad 05
1930s in Kent
Folkestone